Barua Buddhists come from the small Barua community of Bengali-speaking Theravada Buddhists native to Tripura in north-east India. Barua Buddhist institutes have been established in India and Bangladesh.

Barua Buddhist Institutes

References 

Buddhism in Asia